Juan Ignacio Gauthier (born March 3, 1982 in Buenos Aires) is an Argentine rugby union footballer who plays at fullback.

He had 2 caps for Argentina national rugby union team, in 2008, and scored 3 tries, 15 points on aggregate. He played for Hindú Club and currently plays for Rome.

References

External links
At scrum.com
On Statbunker

See also
Argentina national rugby union team

1982 births
Living people
Argentine rugby union players
Argentina international rugby union players
Hindú Club players
Rugby union fullbacks
Rugby union players from Buenos Aires